Who You Selling For Tour was the fourth headlining tour by American rock band The Pretty Reckless in support of their third studio album, Who You Selling For.

Opening acts
 Holy White Hounds 
 Them Evils 
 The Cruel Knives

Set list
The following set list is representative of the show on November 12, 2016 in House of Blues in Cleveland.
"Follow Me Down"
"Since You're Gone"
"Oh My God"
"Hangman"
"Make Me Wanna Die"
"My Medicine"
"Prisoner"
"Sweet Things"
"Living in the Storm"
"Heaven Knows"
"Going to Hell"
"Take Me Down"
Encore
"Fucked Up World"

Controversy 
After the passing of Chris Cornell, the band postponed their May 19 show at the Starland Ballroom in Sayreville, New Jersey just 3 hours before fans would be let into the venue. Many fans had already made their way (or were on the way) to the venue by the time the band announced the postponement, some traveling from out-of-state. The band was criticized for performing the next day in Camden, stating that "The show must go on". The band is also being criticized on social media due to the lack of communication about the rescheduled date of the Starland Ballroom show. Over a month later, the band had not yet released any information for the rescheduled show. After over a month of silence, the band finally announced the show's rescheduled date, November 10, 2017.

Shows

Cancelations and rescheduled shows

Notes

References

2016 concert tours
2017 concert tours